Micrurapteryx sophorivora is a moth of the family Gracillariidae. It is known from Kazakhstan, the European part of Russia and Tajikistan.

The larvae feed on Sophora species. They mine the leaves of their host plant. The mine has the form of a blotch mine.

References

Gracillariinae
Moths described in 1985